George Vernon Powys, 7th Baron Lilford (8 January 1931 – 3 January 2005), was the son of Robert Horace Powys and Vera Grace Bryant. Born in 1931, he inherited the title of Baron Lilford in 1949 following the death of Stephen Powys, 6th Baron Lilford (his second cousin twice removed), until his death on 3 January 2005 at Paarl, South Africa.

Personal life
His father died in 1940 so at the age of eighteen years he inherited the title of Lord Lilford from his second cousin twice removed, Stephen Powys.
He was educated at Stonyhurst College and lived at Saint John, Jersey, Channel Islands, following the divorce from his fourth wife.

His first wife was Eve Bird whom he married in 1954.
He moved to South Africa and married Anuta Merritt on 29 June 1957, but were divorced by September 1958. He set up a business in South Africa by where he manufactured car tyres. He married third wife Norma Yyvonne Shell on 12 September 1958, but were divorced in 1961.

His fourth wife was Muriel Spottiswoode whom he married on 23 December 1961. They had two children Clare Lynette Powys (born 1962) and Emma-Jane (born 1964) and divorced in 1969 by where Muriel won the Heskin Hall estate in the divorce agreement.

His fifth wife was Margaret Penman whom he married in 1969 and had three children with Sarah Margaret (born 1971), Hannah Victoria (born 1974), Mark Vernon (born 1975). George and Margaret divorced in 1991, George died in 2005 and was succeeded to the title of 8th Baron Lilford by his son Mark.

References

1931 births
2005 deaths
George
Lilford